Qosqophryne is a genus of strabomantid frogs. These frogs are endemic to south-eastern Peru in the Cusco Region at 3270 to 3800 meters above sea level. A phylogenetic analysis found Qosqophryne as sister to the genus Microkayla and that this clade was more closely related to Noblella and Psychrophrynella than to other species in Bryophryne.

Taxonomy
The genus Qosqophryne was erected in 2020 to accommodate three species that were in Bryophryne at that time.

Species
The following species are recognised in the genus Qosqophryne:
 Qosqophryne flammiventris Lehr and Catenazzi, 2010
 Qosqophryne gymnotis Lehr E, Catenazzi A 2009
 Qosqophryne mancoinca Mamani L, Catenazzi A, Ttito A, Chaparro JC 2017

References

strabomantidae
Amphibians of South America
Endemic fauna of Peru
Amphibian genera